is a Japanese former swimmer. He competed in the men's 4 × 100 metre medley relay with a final rank of fifth at the 1964 Summer Olympics.

References

External links
 

1946 births
Living people
Japanese male breaststroke swimmers
Olympic swimmers of Japan
Swimmers at the 1964 Summer Olympics
Universiade medalists in swimming
Place of birth missing (living people)
Asian Games medalists in swimming
Asian Games gold medalists for Japan
Asian Games silver medalists for Japan
Swimmers at the 1962 Asian Games
Medalists at the 1962 Asian Games
Swimmers at the 1966 Asian Games
Medalists at the 1966 Asian Games
Universiade silver medalists for Japan
Universiade bronze medalists for Japan
Medalists at the 1967 Summer Universiade
20th-century Japanese people